Vicia hassei is a species of vetch known by the common names Hasse's vetch and slender vetch.

It is native to the west coast of North America from Oregon through California to Baja California, where it occurs in many types of coastal and inland habitat.

Description
Vicia hassei is an annual herb. The leaves are made up of a few pairs of leaflets up to 2.5 centimeters long often with flat, notched, or toothed tips.

The inflorescence is usually a solitary flower or a pair of flowers with white or lavender corollas just under a centimeter long.

The fruit is a legume pod 2 or 3 centimeters in length and a few millimeters wide which contains the seeds.

References

External links
Jepson Manual Treatment: Vicia hassei
USDA Plants Profile
Vicia hassei — U.C. Photo gallery

hassei
Flora of Baja California
Flora of California
Flora of Oregon
Natural history of the California chaparral and woodlands
Natural history of the California Coast Ranges
Natural history of the Central Valley (California)
Natural history of the Channel Islands of California
Natural history of the Peninsular Ranges
Natural history of the San Francisco Bay Area
Natural history of the Santa Monica Mountains
Natural history of the Transverse Ranges
Flora without expected TNC conservation status